A list of the films produced in Mexico in 1953 (see 1953 in film):

1953

External links

1953
Films
Lists of 1953 films by country or language